David Glyndwr Dear (born 8 June 1946 in Southampton) is a British former 100 metres sprinter.

Athletics career
He competed in the 1972 Summer Olympics.

He represented England in the sprint events, at the 1966 British Empire and Commonwealth Games in Kingston, Jamaica.

Four years later he won a bronze medal at the 1970 British Commonwealth Games, in Edinburgh, Scotland.

References

1946 births
Living people
English male sprinters
Olympic athletes of Great Britain
Athletes (track and field) at the 1972 Summer Olympics
Commonwealth Games bronze medallists for England
Athletes (track and field) at the 1966 British Empire and Commonwealth Games
Athletes (track and field) at the 1970 British Commonwealth Games
People from Romsey
Sportspeople from Hampshire
Commonwealth Games medallists in athletics
Medallists at the 1970 British Commonwealth Games